Let Em Ave It is the second studio album by English rapper Giggs. The album was released on 21 June 2010 under XL Recordings. It is the follow-up to his debut album Walk in da Park (2008). The album was supported by four singles — "Slow Songs", "Don't Go There", "Look What the Cat Dragged In" and "Hustle On", two of which charted in the top 60 of the UK Singles Chart. The album features guest appearances from B.o.B, Joe Grind, Gunna Dee, Starboy Nathan, among others. Production derived from Bayoz Musik, Boom Productions and Drumma Boy.

The album debuted at number 35 on the UK Albums Chart – at the time becoming Giggs' highest-charting album.

Background
The album was recorded in London at The Workshop studio and also Canalon Studios. The album was mixed by London-based producer Gan Juan. The album will feature the single "Look What the Cat Dragged In" that was released on 7 June 2010. Giggs also released the single "Don't Go There", which featured B.o.B. "Slow Songs", which features Mike Skinner, was included on the album as a bonus track.

Singles
"Slow Songs" was announced as the album's first single but was not publicised. The song features The Streets. The track only features as a bonus song on the album and is not part of the official track listing.
"Don't Go There" was released as the second single on 24 February 2010. It was expected to chart at a high position, but failed to make the UK Top 40 despite a large amount of airplay. The song features B.o.B. The track only features as a bonus song on the album and is not part of the official track listing.
"Look What the Cat Dragged In" was released as the album's third single on 6 June 2010. It reached number 52 on the UK Top 100.
"Hustle On" was released as the fourth single on 28 September 2010.

Critical reception

Let Em Ave It garnered generally positive reviews from music critics. James McMahon of NME gave high praise to Giggs' delivery of street tales while giving it a distinct UK flavour, concluding that "his second record is certainly a collection of stories this island has rarely heard told in one of its own accents." Adam Kennedy of BBC also gave praise to Giggs' bare-bones approach to gangster rap while still remaining British as possible, concluding that, "Eschewing daytime radio hit filler, with menacing heat such as past single 'Look What the Cat Dragged In' stashed in his arsenal, Giggs certainly lets anybody who stands in his path have it."

Michael Cragg of MusicOMH said that despite Giggs' slow-paced flow and lack of interesting rhymes, he praised the production for giving elevation to the tracks, concluding that "Let Em Ave It isn’t going to appeal to all rap fans, let alone the music buying public at large, but what it does do is introduce a major new talent to UK rap." Matt Jost of RapReviews found some of the material too reminiscent to other American rappers but praised Giggs' conversational delivery of the tracks for resembling Z-Ro's works, calling it "An album that very often sounds all too familiar but that still persuades with individual personality and local flair."

Track listing

Chart performance

References

2010 albums
Albums produced by Mike Skinner (musician)
Giggs (rapper) albums
Takeover Entertainment albums
XL Recordings albums